NH 11C may refer to:

 National Highway 11C (India)
 New Hampshire Route 11C, United States